Antonio López Ojeda (born 18 May 1989) is a Mexican professional footballer who plays as a forward.

Honours
América
Liga MX: Clausura 2013

Tampico Madero
Liga de Expansión MX: Guardianes 2020

External links
  Club América official website with quote and basic info
 
 
 

1989 births
Living people
Association football forwards
Club América footballers
Club Puebla players
Mineros de Zacatecas players
Atlante F.C. footballers
Potros UAEM footballers
Correcaminos UAT footballers
Liga MX players
Ascenso MX players
Liga Premier de México players
Footballers from Baja California Sur
Mexican footballers
People from La Paz, Baja California Sur